The Ministry of Labour, Employment and Social Solidarity (in French: Ministère du Travail, de l’Emploi et de la Solidarité sociale) is a government department in the Canadian province of Quebec. Its primary function is to promote employment and provide financial support for economically disadvantaged people.

The department is overseen by the Minister of Employment and Social Solidarity, who is a member of the Executive Council of Quebec. Ministerial responsibility for employment was separated from social solidarity in 2001, and a different minister assigned to each field. The positions were reunited in 2003. The current minister is Jean Boulet.

External links
Ministère de l’Emploi et de la Solidarité

References

Employment
Quebec